Majeakgoro is a town in Dr Ruth Segomotsi Mompati District Municipality in the North West province of South Africa. It is composed of two villages, Lower Majeakgoro and Upper Majeakgoro. It is under the leadership of a chief and tribal council.

References 

Populated places in the Greater Taung Local Municipality